12th Man is a 2022 Indian Malayalam-language mystery thriller film directed by Jeethu Joseph and produced by Antony Perumbavoor through Aashirvad Cinemas, with a screenplay by K. R. Krishna Kumar and based on a story by Sunir Khetarpal. The film stars Mohanlal, with Unni Mukundan, Saiju Kurup, Anu Sithara, Anusree, Sshivada, Chandhunath, Anu Mohan, Rahul Madhav, Aditi Ravi, Priyanka Nair and Leona Lishoy. This film is loosely based on the core idea of 2016 Italian film Perfect Strangers.

The original background score and a song was composed by Anil Johnson. Principal photography took place from August to October 2021 lasting 48 days and post-production went up to March 2022. The film was shot extensively at a custom-built mansion in a hillside resort in Kulamavu, Idukki district, and the remaining in Ernakulam. 12th Man was released directly on Disney+ Hotstar on 20 May 2022. The film received mixed to positive reviews from critics.

Plot
11 people gathered at an isolated resort for bachelors party of their friend Siddharth. It includes Fida, Siddharth’s fiancée Aarathy, Mathew and his wife Shiny, Jithesh and his wife Dr. Nayana, Sam and his wife Merin, Zachariah and his wife Annie. Out of these, Annie, Fida, Jithesh, Mathew, Merin, Siddharth and Zachariah, were college mates. They are interrupted by a seemingly annoying person called Chandrashekhar who demands alcohol from them. They pacify and send him away.

During dinner, An argument ensues between the friends when Fida claims that even though they are friends, there are always certain secrets kept within individuals that they won’t even share with their own spouse. To settle the argument they decide to play a game wherein each one of them are to keep their phones on the table and publicly announce the text messages they receive as well as keep their phones on speaker if they receive a call.

This leads to many embarrassing secrets to be revealed. The main conflict happens when Siddharth gets a call from one of his friends asking him about the name of abortion pills used by him when he made one of his group members pregnant. This leads to a brawl amongst them as he is unmarried, leading everyone to believe that he must have had an affair with one of their wives. As the night progresses, Shiny is revealed to have fallen to her death on the nearby view point.

The investigation goes on where the gang come to know that Chandrashekhar is actually an DYSP who is on leave and  begins to question each one of them regarding their alibis and possible motives. He then plays the same game from earlier that night. It is revealed that Siddharth was not the one having an affair but was merely covering up for Jithesh. When questioned, Jithesh claims that he was having an affair with Shiny, implying that she must have committed suicide due to the fear of being humiliated.

The fact that Shiny was suffering from bipolar disorder, and also contributes to his claims as Shiny's consulting doctor confirms that Bipolar people do have suicidal tendencies depending on their state, but to everyones shock, Jithesh's claims are proven wrong as Dr. Nayana puts out that it is impossible that Shiny fits into the abortion story as she cannot have children. Chandrashekar finds out that an amount of  has been transferred to Shiny's account prior to her death which is confirmed from the calls from one of Mathew's moneylenders.

It is revealed that only  has been transferred from Jithesh's account, meaning the rest  must have been transferred from the account of the woman involved in the affair. Upon further investigation, it is revealed that Merin is the one who transferred the money and was with whom Jithesh was having an affair. Merin sought Shiny’s help as Aarathy told Siddharth to bring both Jithesh and his lover to her in order to prove his innocence.

Shiny (Anusree)  thus requests  from both Jithesh and Merin. She then asks Annie to pretend to be Jithesh’s lover in front of Aarathy instead of Merin, blackmailing her with a video Shiny shot when Annie was having an affair with a colleague, but Annie refuses. After extensive questioning, Chandrashekar comes to a conclusion that since Sam and Merin have a joint account, Sam was confused by why such a large amount was transferred to Shiny. As he confronts Shiny regarding the same, Shiny, in a fit of rage, shouts out that it is to cover his wife’s affair. An enraged Sam unintentionally pushes her to the edge, which eventually makes her fall off the point. Thus, Chandrashekhar leaves the friends in the room as dawn breaks, leaving their fate unknown.

Cast

Voice cast
 Murali Gopy as DYSP Sreekumar, Chandrasekhar's friend and colleague 
 Mallika Sukumaran as Zachariah's mother
 Kottayam Pradeep as Sidharth's uncle
 Soubin Shahir as "Pwoli Sarath", Jithesh's friend
 Aju Varghese as Sajish, Sidharth's friend
 Irshad as John
 Jeethu Joseph as Merin's brother

Production

Development
On 5 July 2021, sharing a title poster actor Mohanlal announced 12th Man as his consecutive and forthcoming association with director Jeethu Joseph following the release of their Drishyam 2 earlier that year, with Antony Perumbavoor of Aashirvad Cinemas returning as producer. The announcement came amid the suspended production of Ram, their then unfinished project, which was put on hold indefinitely due to the COVID-19 pandemic in India. The screenplay was written by K. R. Krishna Kumar. Describing the film, Jeethu told in an interview that the film tells the story of 12 people, with about 90 percent of the film is set in a single location, and that "12th Man is a mystery that compares to the likes of films based on Agatha Christie's books". He added that the suspense laid story happens in 24 hours and 12th Man can be made within the restrictions of COVID-19 pandemic and would begin filming once the government lifts the pause on film productions.

Sunir Khetarpal who produced Jeethu's The Body gave the basic story idea of 12th Man to Jeethu, hence the film's story right is with Khetarpal. Jeethu and Kumar discussed the story one-and-a-half years ago (from July 2021). It took one-and-a-half years for Kumar to complete the screenplay, which he describes as a mystery thriller. Even though, they decided on making Kooman first. In meantime, Jeethu told the story to Mohanlal and Antony at the sets of Drishyam 2. Jeethu received the final screenplay from Kumar during the shoot of Telugu film Drushyam 2, who conveyed it to Mohanlal and Antony, thus the project was green-lit. 12th Man was then planned as to begin in 2022 after the completion of Mohanlal's Barroz: Nidhi Kaakkum Bootham and Ram. However, after the surge of second wave of COVID-19 in India they were compelled to postpone Kooman as it required multiple location shoots, which was difficult with COVID-19 restrictions in effect, hence they decided to go ahead with 12th Man which requires only two locations.

Casting
There are a total of 14 characters in the film. The final principal cast include Mohanlal, Unni Mukundan, Saiju Kurup, Rahul Madhav, Anu Sithara, Leona Lishoy, Anu Mohan, Anusree, Chandunadh, Aditi Ravi, Sshivada, and Priyanka Nair. Mukundan read the screenplay while he was filming for Bro Daddy. Shine Tom Chacko, Veena Nandakumar, and Santhi Priya were part of the initial cast line but was replaced. Jeethu said that the challenge was to get everyone's dates together as everyone were already committed to other projects which were at various stages of production. Sshivada recalled in an interview that she was invited to the film by Jeethu asking that if she was interested in doing a "small OTT film" produced by Aashirvad Cinemas and starring Mohanlal.

Filming
Principal photography began on 17 August 2021 coinciding with the Kerala New Year on the first day of the Malayalam month Chingam. It commenced with a customary pooja ceremony in Ernakulam. Shooting then took place at GreenBerg Holiday Resorts in Kulamavu, Idukki district. Mohanlal joined the set on 15 September. The entire resort was booked for the shoot. Idukki was the primary location of the film. Filming was completed on 3 October after 48 days of shooting. Satheesh Kurup was the film's cinematographer. Shooting of the film was delayed by five days due to rain and mist. It was the first instance in Jeethu's career that filming went beyond the scheduled dates.

Jeethu said "12th Man requires quite a bit of post-production work". In November 2021, Jeethu said that the post-production was going on which he expects to complete by January or February next year. Post-production was completed by late March 2022.

Music
The original background score and songs are composed, arranged, and produced by Anil Johnson. The title song "Find" in English was sung by Souparnika Rajagopal, The Times of India wrote that "the song indeed has some mysterious vibes which are very reminiscent of James Bond Theme songs".

Release

Streaming
12th Man was released on Mohanlal's birthday eve on 20 May 2022 on the streaming platform Disney+ Hotstar.

Marketing
Prior to release, Jeethu promoted the film on the Mohanlal hosted TV show Bigg Boss (season 4). Disney+ Hotstar also conducted a game to find out the killer based on clues.

Reception
The film received mixed to positive reviews from critics. The Times of India rated the film 4 out of 5 stars and wrote "An Entertaining, Delicious Whodunnit. 12th Man is definitely worth a watch and is sure to appeal to more than the Malayali audience."
Critic Latha Srinivasan wrote in the Moneycontrol review that "The interrogation style, the narration and clever writing in the second half is the crux of this Jeethu Joseph-Mohanlal film and that is what makes the movie a compelling watch."

References

External links
 

2022 films
2022 thriller films
2020s Malayalam-language films
Indian mystery thriller films
Films shot in Munnar
Films directed by Jeethu Joseph
Aashirvad Cinemas films